James Edison Figurado (born July 25, 1990) is a Sri Lankan professional footballer who plays as a midfielder for Solid SC and the Sri Lanka national football team.

Having been named for the Sri Lanka squads for the 2015 SAFF Championship and the Bangabandhu Gold Cup, he scored his first international goal in a 4-2 win to Bangladesh in the Bangabandhu Gold Cup.

Scored a scintillating goal straight from taking a corner kick to help Solid SC beat Navy SC 2-1 in the 2014–15 Sri Lanka Football Premier League.

International career

International goals
Scores and results list Sri Lanka's goal tally first.

References

Sri Lankan footballers
Sri Lanka international footballers
Association football midfielders
Living people
1990 births
Solid SC players
Sri Lanka Football Premier League players